Pope Paul may refer to:

Pope Paul I (757–767)
Pope Paul II (1464–1471)
Pope Paul III (1534–1549)
Pope Paul IV (1555–1559)
Pope Paul V (1605–1621)
Pope Paul VI (1963–1978)

See also
 Pope John Paul I (1978)
 Pope John Paul II (1978–2005)
 Paul Pope

Paul

id:Paulus#Paus Katolik Roma